Cathey Palyo (born March 9, 1958) is a professional female bodybuilder from the United States.

Bodybuilding career

Amateur
Cathey rose quickly through the amateur ranks, earning her pro card by winning the overall title at the NPC Nationals in 1986.

Professional
Cathey's relatively brief professional career was highlighted by winning the 1988 Ms. International contest.

Retirement

Legacy
Cathey was the first American bodybuilder to win the Ms. International.

Contest history 

1985 AAU Ms. America - 1st (medium)
1985 NPC Nationals - 4th (HW)
1985 NPC Tournament of Champions - 1st (HW & Overall)
1986 NPC California Championship - 1st overall
1986 NPC USA Championship - 1st (HW)
1986 IFBB World Amateur Championship - 1st (HW)
1986 NPC Nationals - 1st (HW & Overall)
1986 IFBB World Mixed Pairs with J.J.Marsh - 2nd
1987 IFBB Ms. Olympia - 14th
1988 Ms. International - 1st
1988 Pro World Championship - 4th
1988 IFBB Ms. Olympia - 16th

POST COMPETITIVE CAREER
Going back to her maiden name of Catt Tripoli in 2000, she wrote and published her book - Conscious Fitness, which won the Nautilus Book Award Silver in the Body, Mind, Spirit Practices category in 2016.
In 2009 she became a Certified Clinical Hypnotherapist and opened her practice in Santa Rosa California.
She was the owner and developer of four different gyms in Santa Rosa. 5th St Fitness, Body Central, Fusion Fitness and Powerhouse Gym. 
She has been an annual speaker at the Omni Athlete Festival since its inception in 2016 and has been a guest on many podcasts and YouTube videos.

References

| colspan = 3 align = center | Ms. International
|-
| width = 30% align = center | Preceded by:Erika Geisen
| width = 40% align = center | First (1988)
| width = 30% align = center | Succeeded by:Jackie Paisley

1958 births
American female bodybuilders
Living people
Professional bodybuilders
Sportspeople from California
21st-century American women